John George Lambton, 1st Earl of Durham,  (12 April 1792 – 28 July 1840), also known as "Radical Jack" and commonly referred to in Canadian history texts simply as Lord Durham, was a British Whig statesman, colonial administrator, Governor General and high commissioner of British North America. A leading reformer, Durham played a major role in the passage of the Reform Bill of 1832. He later served as ambassador to Russia. He was a founding member and chairman of the New Zealand Company that played a key role in the colonisation of New Zealand. George Woodcock says that he was, "Proud, wayward, immensely rich, with romantic good looks and an explosive temper." He was one of those "natural rebels who turn their rebellious energies to constructive purposes. Both at home and abroad he became a powerful exponent of the early nineteenth-century liberal spirit."

Background and education
Lambton was born 12 April 1792 in the house of his father William Henry Lambton at 14 Berkeley Square in St George Hanover Square (now within the City of Westminster). His mother was Lady Anne Barbara Frances, daughter of George Villiers, 4th Earl of Jersey. Lambton was christened with the names of his grandfathers, John Lambton and George Villiers.  In the time of Lambton's birth, his father was taking active part in the formation and chairing of the Society of the Friends of the People.

After attending Eton he joined the army in 1809 as a cornet in the 10th Hussars, but resigned in 1811.  Following his father's death in 1797, Durham had inherited an immense fortune, derived largely from mining on lands surrounding Lambton Castle, the ancestral family home in County Durham, which formed the basis of Lambton Collieries. Other properties in County Durham included Dinsdale Park and Low Dinsdale Manor.. In 1821, he earned the epithet 'Jog Along Jack' after being asked what he considered an adequate income for an English gentleman and replying that "a man might jog along comfortably enough on £40,000 a year" (equivalent to approximately £3,900,000 at 2014 values)

He supported educational projects such as the Mechanics' Institutes and the newly founded University of London.

New Zealand
In 1825 Lambton took the chairmanship of the New Zealand Company, a venture that made the first attempt to colonise New Zealand, with his interest being philanthropic. However the venture did not succeed at colonisation.

Political career 
Durham was first elected to Parliament for County Durham in the general election of 1812, a seat he held until 1828, when he was raised to the peerage as Baron Durham, of the City of Durham and of Lambton Castle in the County Palatine of Durham. In Parliament he supported liberal causes, from the defence of Queen Caroline to the removal of political disabilities on Dissenters and Roman Catholics. When his father-in-law Lord Grey became prime minister in 1830, Durham was sworn of the Privy Council and appointed Lord Privy Seal. Along with Lord Russell he was a leading promoter of reform. He helped draft the famous Reform Bill of 1832.  It reformed the electoral system by abolishing tiny districts, gave representation to cities, gave the vote to small landowners, tenant farmers, and shopkeepers and to householders who paid a yearly rental of £10 or more and some lodgers.

Lord Durham resigned from cabinet in 1833. Later the same year he was further honoured when he was made Viscount Lambton and Earl of Durham. Between 1835 and 1837, he served as Ambassador to Russia. While in Russia, he was invested as a Knight of the Order of St. Alexander Nevsky, of the Order of St. Andrew and of the Order of St. Anna. In 1837, he was appointed a Knight Grand Cross of the Order of the Bath.

Canada
In 1838, Lord Durham was named Governor General and High Commissioner for British North America (several North American colonies administered collectively by the Colonial Office, including: the Provinces of Lower Canada and Upper Canada, Nova Scotia, New Brunswick, and their several Dependencies, Newfoundland, Prince Edward Island, Cape Breton and Bermuda). A main task set for him was to investigate the political situation there after the Rebellions of 1837 in Upper Canada (Ontario) and Lower Canada (Quebec) and recommendations as to necessary reforms.

He and his longtime colleague Edward Gibbon Wakefield arrived in Lower Canada on 29 May 1838. One of his tasks as governor general was to investigate the circumstances surrounding the Lower Canada Rebellion of Louis-Joseph Papineau and the Upper Canada Rebellion of William Lyon Mackenzie, which had occurred in 1837. His decisions with regard to the Rebellion prisoners encountered stiff opposition at Westminster. He lost the support of the Prime Minister, Melbourne, whereupon he published his repudiation and resignation 9 October 1838 and set sail for London on 1 November.

Durham's detailed and famous Report on the Affairs of British North America (London, January 1839) recommended a modified form of responsible government and a legislative union of Upper Canada, Lower Canada and the Maritime Provinces in order to assimilate the French Canadians, who he considered inferior.

Lord Durham has been lauded in Canadian history for his recommendation to introduce responsible government. However, the British government did not accept that recommendation. It took 10 more years before a responsible parliament was established in the colonies. (Colonial legislatures had existed in the two Canadas since 1791 but were toothless compared to appointed colonial administrators). Lord Durham is less well regarded for recommending the union of Upper and Lower Canada, which resulted in the creation of the united Province of Canada.

As early as 1844, Lord Durham's intended policy of assimilation faced setbacks, as Louis-Hippolyte Lafontaine's party in the House managed to force de facto re-establishment of French as a language of Parliament. Once responsible government was achieved (1848), French Canadians in Canada East succeeded by voting as a bloc in ensuring that they were powerfully represented in any cabinet, especially as the politics of Canada West was highly factional. The resulting deadlock between Canada East and West led to a movement for federal rather than unitary government, which resulted in the creation of confederation, a federal state known as the Dominion of Canada, incorporating New Brunswick and Nova Scotia, and dividing the United Canadas into two provinces, Ontario (Canada West) and Quebec (Canada East), in 1867.

Family

Lord Durham was twice married. He fell in love with Harriet, the illegitimate daughter of the Earl of Cholmondeley, but then aged under 21 and refused the required permission by his guardians to marry her, they married at Gretna Green on 1 January 1812, then in an Anglican ceremony at her father's estate of Malpas, Cheshire, on 28 January that year. They had three daughters, who all predeceased him:

Lady Frances Charlotte (16 October 1812 – 18 December 1835), married the Hon. John Ponsonby (later 5th Earl of Bessborough), but died a few months later of consumption.
The Hon. Georgiana Sarah Elizabeth (2 March 1814 – 3 January 1833)
The Hon. Harriet Caroline (30 May 1815 – 12 June 1832)

After Harriet's death in July 1815, he married secondly Lady Louisa Grey, daughter of Charles Grey, 2nd Earl Grey, on 9 December 1816 at Lord Grey's estate, Howick, Northumberland. She was an amateur artist. They had two sons and three daughters:

The Hon. Charles William (16 January 1818 – 24 September 1831) – see The Red Boy
Lady Mary Louisa (8 May 1819 – 9 March 1898), married James Bruce, 8th Earl of Elgin
Lady Emily Augusta (17 May 1823 – 2 November 1886), married Henry Cavendish, son of the Hon. Henry Cavendish
The Hon. George Frederick D'Arcy (5 September 1828 – 27 November 1879), later 2nd Earl of Durham
Lady Alice Anne Caroline (16 April 1831 – 15 January 1907), married Sholto Douglas, Lord Aberdour (later 18th Earl of Morton)

Lord Durham died at Cowes on the Isle of Wight in July 1840, aged 48, and was buried at St Mary and St Cuthbert, Chester-le-Street.  He was succeeded by his eldest and only surviving son, George. The Countess of Durham only survived her husband by a year and died aged 44 on 26 November 1841 at Genoa from a serious cold.

In literature
In one of her occasional political forays, Letitia Elizabeth Landon in her poetical illustration to Sir Thomas Lawrence's portrait, 'The Right Honourable Lord Durham. Now on an Embassy at the Court of Russia' in Fisher's Drawing Room Scrap Book, 1833', expresses her hopes that Lord Durham be able to persuade the Russians to return to Poland its lost freedom and sovereignty.

Legacy

Names given in honour of the Earl include Lambton County, Ontario, Lambton, Toronto (including Lambton Mills, Lambton Mills Cemetery and Lambton House), Lambton Avenue in Toronto, Lord Durham Public School (Ajax, Ontario, closed), Lambton, Québec, Lambton Quay, Lambton Ward and Lambton Harbour in Wellington in New Zealand, and Durham Heights and Cape Lambton (both in the southern tip of Banks Island in the Northwest Territories). The Penshaw Monument in County Durham, on a hill west of Sunderland, was built in his honour.

References

Works cited

Bibliography

In English 

 
 
 
 New, Chester. "Lord Durham and the British Background of His Report." Canadian Historical Review 20.2 (1939): 119–135. online
 New, Chester. Lord Durham's Mission to Canada: A Biography of John George Lambton, First Earl of Durham Clarendon Press, 1929) online.
 
 Reid, Stuart J. Life and Letters of the First Earl of Durham: 1792–1840 (2 vol London: Longmans, Green and Company. 1906). vol 1 online; also   vol 2 online
 
 Woodcock, George. "'Radical Jack': John George Lambton, First Earl of Durham." History Today 9.1 (1959): 3–12.

Primary sources
 
 
 *

In French 

 
 
 Fernand Ouellet « Lambton, John George, 1er comte de Durham [archive] », dans le Dictionnaire biographique du Canada en ligne, University of Toronto et Université Laval, 2000

External links 
 
 Watch the 1961 short drama Lord Durham at the National Film Board of Canada
  (imdb.com entry for the above film)
 Archives of John George Lambton, 1st Earl of Durham (John George Lambton, 1st Earl of Durham fonds, R2469) are held at Library and Archives Canada

1792 births
1840 deaths
10th Royal Hussars officers
Governors-General of the Province of Canada
Lieutenant Governors of Lower Canada
Lords Privy Seal
Earls in the Peerage of the United Kingdom
People from Mayfair
Knights Grand Cross of the Order of the Bath
Members of the Privy Council of the United Kingdom
John Lambton, 1st Earl of Durham
Diplomatic peers
Ambassadors of the United Kingdom to Russia
Lambton, John
Lambton, John
Lambton, John
Lambton, John
Lambton, John
UK MPs who were granted peerages
Persons of National Historic Significance (Canada)
Recipients of the Order of St. Anna
Recipients of the Order of the White Eagle (Russia)
Peers of the United Kingdom created by William IV